Catherine Honan (born 16 September 1951) is a former Progressive Democrats politician from County Laois in Ireland. She was a Senator from 1993 to 1997.

An accountant before entering politics, she stood unsuccessfully as a Progressive Democrats candidate for Dáil Éireann in the Laois–Offaly constituency at four successive general elections: 1987, 1989, 1992 and 1997. After her 1992 defeat, she was elected to the 20th Seanad Éireann by the Industrial and Commercial Panel; this was facilitated by an electoral pact with Democratic Left. She did not contest the 1997 Seanad election.

References

1951 births
Living people
Progressive Democrats senators
Local councillors in County Laois
Members of the 20th Seanad
20th-century women members of Seanad Éireann
Politicians from County Laois